Seediri Appalaraju is an Indian politician from the state of Andhra Pradesh. He belongs to the YSRCP. He is the current Minister of Andhra Pradesh for Animal Husbandry. He is also the Minister of Fisheries & Dairy Development.

Assembly elections 2019

References 

YSR Congress Party politicians
Living people
1981 births